Daughter-sister may refer to:

Sister-daughter, an archaic term for niece.
The Daughters Sisters Project, a non-profit organization.